Class Reunion is a 1982 American black comedy film produced by National Lampoon as the third film from the magazine. It was the second film released; although National Lampoon Goes To The Movies was filmed in 1981, it was delayed and not released until 1982.

Plot
Lizzie Borden High's class of 1972 is getting ready to go through the motions at their 10-year reunion when a deranged alumnus named Walter Baylor, who was driven insane by a horrible, sadistic, senior-year prank, escapes from the mental institution and decides to crash the party at his high school reunion. Guests start to disappear and are found dead; the other alumni, including the high class snooty yacht salesman Bob Spinnaker, class tease Bunny Packard, and the class zero Gary Nash, spring into action as they try to uncover the culprit and put an end to the nightmare that has become their class reunion.

Cast

Production
John Hughes claimed he had been fired from the film. "They didn't even want me around, and I was shocked when I saw the movie", he said. "My screenplay had been completely butchered, and my name will nevertheless be on the credits forever."

Release
The film was released theatrically in the United States by 20th Century Fox in October 1982. It proved to be a huge disappointment for the company, grossing only $10,054,150 at the box office. In the opening weekend for the film, it made $3,086,525.

In 1982, Dell Publishing released a "photo novel" version book, adapted from John Hughes' screenplay by Sandra Choron. The film was released on VHS, Betamax and laserdisc by Vestron Video in 1983. In August 1998, Anchor Bay Entertainment re-released the film on VHS. In 2000, Anchor Bay Entertainment released the film on DVD. The film was re-released on DVD by MGM in 2005.

In April 2018, Kino Lorber announced it would release the film on DVD and Blu-ray, sourced from a new 4K transfer.

Soundtrack
The score for the 1982 movie National Lampoons Class Reunion was composed by Peter Bernstein and Mark Goldenberg and includes a live onscreen performance by Chuck Berry, and a small scene where the actors perform the classic 1965 hit "Stop! in the Name of Love". The score was edited by Jim Harrison and Lada Productions.

Songs were performed by:
 Gary "U.S." Bonds – "Class Reunion" (written by Peter Bernstein and Mark Goldenberg)
 Chuck Berry – "It Wasn't Me", "My Dingaling", and "Festival"

National Lampoon history
National Lampoon's Class Reunion was the second big-screen movie that was released from the Original National Lampoon Company. The movie had a huge buildup, and viewers expected it to be another hit for the National Lampoon franchise, because it was following National Lampoon's Animal House, the company's first big-screen release in 1978. The original company consisted of the writers from the National Lampoon magazine and some of the cast from the National Lampoon Radio Hour and the stage show National Lampoon's Lemmings.

Reviews
National Lampoon's Class Reunion suffered negative reviews on release.

According to TV Guide, "this is a very unfunny film which was released after the successful National Lampoon's Animal House, and which died at the box office, focuses on the 10th reunion of a 1972 high-school graduating class. The plot combines both comedy and horror-slasher elements, a combination that doesn't work. A murderer is killing off class members, who are such dull, dreary creatures no one could blame him. Even Chuck Berry, who makes brief appearance singing a medley of his songs, can't save this one."

Christopher Tookey states, "Very inferior follow-up to Animal House, with remarkably tasteless basis for comedy. John Hughes can be blamed for the script, a feeble spoof of a slasher movie. Songs are used to extend running length, but even Chuck Berry seems under par."

Movie historian Leonard Maltin seemed to agree, citing the picture as a "BOMB" and calling it "Spectacularly unfunny...If you went to school with people like this, no jury on earth would convict you for becoming a homicidal maniac, either."

References

External links 
  at MGM.com
 
 
 

1982 films
1980s black comedy films
1980s comedy horror films
ABC Motion Pictures films
20th Century Fox films
Class reunions in popular culture
1980s parody films
Class Reunion
1980s serial killer films
American black comedy films
American comedy horror films
Films with screenplays by John Hughes (filmmaker)
Parodies of horror
1982 comedy films
1980s English-language films
Films directed by Michael Miller (director)
1980s American films